António Taurino Mega Ferreira (24 March 1949 – 26 December 2022) was a Portuguese writer and journalist.

Publications

References

1949 births
2022 deaths
Portuguese male writers
Portuguese journalists
Alumni of the University of Manchester
Writers from Lisbon